Chatpati (Hindi: चटपटी; English: Spiced) is a 1983 Bollywood film directed by V. Ravindra and produced by Deven Verma, starring Smita Patil and Raj Kiran in lead role. The film also has a huge supporting cast including Reema Lagoo, Sudhir Dalvi, Shreeram Lagoo, Mumtaz Shanti, Preeti Ganguli and Jayshree T.

Plot
This is the story of a girl, her dreams and madness about a perfect groom.

Cast
 Smita Patil As Chatpati
 Raj Kiran
 Reema Lagoo
 Shreeram Lagoo
 Sudhir Dalvi
 Master Bhagwan
 Raj Bharati
 Raj Kumar Kapoor
 Jayshree T.
 Mumtaz Shanti
 Preeti Ganguli
 Seema Deo
 Birbal
 Padma Khanna
 Viju Khote
 Romesh Sharma
 Inder Thakur

Soundtrack
Music arranged, composed and directed by Basu Manohari. Music direction under the musical duo of Basu Manohari

References

External links

1983 films
1980s Hindi-language films